The 2006 Belgian football Cup Final, took place on 13 May 2006 between Zulte Waregem and Mouscron. It was the 51st Belgian Cup final and was won by Zulte Waregem due to an injury time winner by Tim Matthys.

Route to the final

Match

Details

External links
  

Belgian Cup finals
Cup Final
Belgian Cup final 2006